Susanne Schmidt (born 14 November 1974 in East Berlin) is a German rower.

References 
 
 

1974 births
Living people
People from East Berlin
Rowers from Berlin
Olympic rowers of Germany
Rowers at the 2004 Summer Olympics
World Rowing Championships medalists for Germany
German female rowers
20th-century German women